B'Elanna Torres  is a main character in Star Trek: Voyager played by Roxann Dawson. She is portrayed as a half-human half-Klingon born in 2346 on the Federation colony Kessik IV. She was admitted to Starfleet academy but dropped out before graduating. 

Torres joined the Maquis in 2370 and was serving on the Val Jean when taken to the Delta Quadrant by the Caretaker alien using his station. After being used for medical experiments, she was left in an Ocampa colony maintained by the same alien that had abducted the Val Jean. That ship was destroyed in a space battle at the Array and she and what remained of that crew joined the USS Voyager. On the ship she was given field commissioned rank of Lieutenant, junior grade and posted in engineering. In 2371, she was promoted to Chief Engineer. 

In 2377, she married Tom Paris and gave birth to their daughter Miral at the beginning of the next year, while Voyager was returning to the Alpha Quadrant.

Character development
The Star Trek: Voyager Companion describes B'Elanna as a young half-human half-Klingon in her twenties who is a member of the Maquis Rebellion.

The producers wanted to hire an actress who could portray B'Elanna's inner struggle between her human and Klingon halves. After Roxann Dawson read for the role, she became the first of the Voyager actors to be cast. Originally, Dawson's makeup differed from the final design; she explained that she had a much more pronounced Klingon forehead and nose and had to wear a set of Klingon teeth, which made her feel uncomfortable. She asked the producers and makeup artist Michael Westmore if they could perhaps make her more attractive and tone down the Klingon makeup. Eventually they came up with a design with which Roxann was happy, something she described as her "beauty monster makeup". Although B'Elanna's character was twenty-five years old when the series began, Dawson was thirty-six.

During season one, Dawson's initial reaction to the episode "Faces" was one of doubt; she felt that it occurred too early in the series and that she did not know the character well enough to play her as two separate people. However, she used the episode to learn more about her character, and it became one of her favorite episodes. When the episode aired, she called her parents to ask their opinions, and they replied, "You were good, but the girl that played that Klingon was really great!", which Dawson took as a compliment. Joy Kilpatrick was a stand-in of one of two versions albeit uncredited. 

During season four, Dawson became pregnant with her first child. The writers decided they did not want B'Elanna to be pregnant as well, so for the duration of Dawson's pregnancy, she was given an engineering lab coat, which was used to help cover her growing pregnancy. 

During the episode "The Killing Game", the Hirogen had taken over Voyager and forced the crew to participate in holodeck recreations of various combat situations, to which B'Elanna's holodeck character is portrayed as pregnant in World War II with a Nazi officer's child.

During season five, Dawson had a meeting with the producers and writers to discuss her character. Roxann explained to them that she felt B'Elanna had an extreme dark side that hadn't been explored, and from that discussion the episode "Extreme Risk" was created. Dawson stated that after the episode aired, she received fan mail praising the issues of depression and inner conflict raised in the episode, with which many people identified.

During season six, Dawson got the chance to explore B'Elanna's Klingon heritage thanks to an episode originally conceived by Ronald D. Moore for Star Trek: Deep Space Nine. In the episode "Barge of the Dead", B'Elanna has a near-death experience and travels to Gre'thor, the Klingon Hell, where she meets her mother, Miral. She discovers that because of the dishonor B'Elanna has caused her family, her mother would spend eternity in Gre'thor. The episode explores some aspects of B'Elanna's character, and also gives further insight into Klingon mythology. Dawson believed the episode had many layers to it, and she believed it was essentially a coming-of-age story for B'Elanna and her final acceptance of her Klingon heritage.

During season seven, a pregnancy storyline was written in for B'Elanna's character. Jessica Gaona played the character's young iteration in the episode "Lineage". At the end of the series, Dawson described B'Elanna's character arc as that of an unruly young woman who matures over the course of seven years.

Character overview

B'Elanna is portrayed as having been born in 2346 on the Federation colony Kessik IV. Torres had a troubled childhood; her human father, John Torres, and Klingon mother, Miral, often fought, and her father ultimately left the household when she was twelve years old depicted in an episode in season 7, although in an earlier episode she said she was five. When she overheard her father discussing his unhappiness in the home of two Klingons, she attempted to run away. When she confronted him, she bitterly told him to leave. He returned to Earth days later, leaving her to be raised by her mother. In season 7 he contacted her through Starfleet Command and asked to resume a relationship to which she agreed.

A mixture of Klingon and human genetics, Torres is shown as prone to aggressive outbursts. She once attacked her schoolmate Daniel Byrd after he repeatedly taunted her, calling her "Miss Turtlehead" due to her cranial ridges. Torres retained this aggressive behavior throughout her life, but she eventually learned to control it.

Starfleet Academy and Maquis
While in the academy, B'Elanna was constantly having trouble with the rules of Starfleet, resulting in her getting four disciplinary hearings and one suspension. But before dropping out, Torres was a valued member of the academy athletics team, competing as a decathlete; making the track and field coach furious in addition to the many other professors unhappy with her choice to leave the academy.

Torres dropped out of Starfleet Academy in 2365 at age 19. A few years later she became a member of the Maquis renegade group, and began developing a profound hatred of the Cardassians. Torres became associated with a Maquis captain named Chakotay, and was serving as chief engineer on his ship, the Val Jean, when they were brought to the Delta Quadrant by the Caretaker.

During her time with the Maquis, Torres reprogrammed a Cardassian missile known as "Dreadnought". The missile, built with artificial intelligence, was originally targeted at Maquis installations. Torres reprogrammed it on a course for a Cardassian installation, but "Dreadnought" was swept into the Delta Quadrant by the Caretaker.

USS Voyager
When both the USS Voyager crew and the Val Jean crew were taken to the Delta Quadrant, Harry Kim and Torres were transported to the Ocampa home world while their respective crews set out to look for them. Being the only two people from their region of the Alpha Quadrant, the two quickly formed a relationship and she nicknamed him "Starfleet" for his faith in the Federation and Starfleet. This relationship would carry on throughout the series as the two would more than occasionally work on tasks together, allowing Kim to prove his intelligence to the whole crew.

In 2371, B'Elanna Torres joined the Voyager crew with the rest of the Maquis from the Val Jean, as Captain Kathryn Janeway offers them the opportunity. She was placed in the engineering department, which had no clear department head because the original chief engineer was killed during the trip to the Delta Quadrant; Captain Janeway promoted Torres to chief engineer based on Voyagers first officer Chakotay's recommendation. Initially, Torres was very outspoken in her disapproval of Captain Janeway's decision to destroy the Caretaker's array, which had the ability to send the Voyager back home from the Delta Quadrant, and carried a small grudge against the captain. Over the first few months, Torres began respecting the captain and her decisions based on Janeway's strong leadership and their shared interest in science.

Shortly after becoming chief engineer, Torres disobeys the captain's orders when Voyager encounters a race known as the Sikarians. The Sikarians have advanced transporter technology that could drastically shorten their 70-year journey, but Sikarian law prohibits the Voyager crew from obtaining it legitimately. Torres becomes involved with a small group of officers who obtain the technology on the Sikarian black market and perpetrate a failed attempt to integrate it into Voyager'''s systems.

Torres, along with Tom Paris, was later kidnapped by the Vidiians. A Vidiian scientist extracts the Klingon DNA from Torres, splicing her into two separate people: one human, one Klingon. He believed the Klingon DNA had a specific biochemical property that could lead to a cure for the Phage, a disease affecting his people. The human Torres is portrayed fraught with fear but having strong technical expertise, while the Klingon Torres is shown as aggressive and impatient. After her escape from the Vidiians the Klingon Torres suffered a fatal wound from the Vidiian energy weapon and died, but the Doctor used her DNA to restore the human Torres to her original half-human/half-Klingon state, as her cellular structure needs the Klingon DNA to survive.

In the episode "Persistence of Vision," it is revealed that Torres at the time had a romantic interest in Chakotay.

In 2373, Torres was the target of telepathically inspired dreams from a member of a race called the Enarans. The dreams were actually memories of a great massacre that took place on the Enaran homeworld and were the elder Enaran's method of making sure that the memory of this massacre lives on, even if in the mind of an alien.

Later that year, Vulcan engineer Vorik triggered Torres' mating instincts when he forcibly initiated a telepathic bond with her while he is experiencing the pon farr. Torres and Tom Paris later became trapped on a planet together during an away mission, and Torres attempted to get Paris to mate with her, but he resisted. Eventually, Vorik and Torres engaged in ritual battle to purge the blood fever.

Torres later began a relationship with Paris after a complicated and stormy courtship. During an incident in 2374, Torres confessed her love to him when they were left floating in space in environmental suits, with almost no hope of rescue ("Day of Honor"). Although Voyager was soon able to rescue them, Torres realized that her courage in admitting her love had brought her one step closer to discovering what she considered true honor. Their relationship first flourished on screen during "Scientific Method". They married in 2377 and their honeymoon was aboard the Delta Flyer.When Torres and Paris conceived their child in 2377, she learned from the Doctor that the child would have distinct Klingon cranial ridges as well as other Klingon traits. Torres, remembering painful events from her own childhood, urged the Doctor to perform gene therapy to reduce this phenotype, and even went so far as to reprogram him to do so. Paris and Captain Janeway both disagreed and prevented the Doctor from performing the genetic modifications. When Paris got her to open up, she admitted that she was afraid her husband would find living with two Klingons too difficult and leave her the way her father did. Once he allayed her fears, he admitted wanting even more children just like their mother, and Torres was shown as finally enjoying the pregnancy ("Lineage").

When a group of Klingon radicals spent time aboard Voyager ("Prophecy"), Torres began opening herself to more Klingon beliefs and, for the first time since childhood, was able to pray for her grandmother, L'Naal, and her great-grandmother, Krelik. When communications with Earth became available ("Author, Author"), she reached out to her estranged father, John Torres.

Torres and Paris' daughter, Miral Paris (named after B'Elanna's mother), was born at the beginning of 2378, during Voyagers trip through a Borg transwarp conduit back to the Alpha Quadrant. In an alternate timeline where Voyager made it home by different means, Miral was shown as an adult serving in Starfleet, with the rank of ensign.

Birthdate

Torres's birthdate—on September 2, 2314, the official Star Trek website published an archive article with information on the press release for the launch of the series. In the document, which includes character biographies, it confirms that when the series began (2371) – "B'Elanna is a beautiful 25-year-old woman who is half-human, half-Klingon..." This information would then place B'Elanna's birthdate at 2346.

The Official Star Trek Voyager Companion gives further evidence to Torres's age. This is a passage taken from the book: "B'ELANNA TORRES is a half-Klingon, half-human in her twenties who is frantically working at the consoles of the barely spaceworthy craft..."

Reception
In March 2019, Syfy rated B'Elanna as the 6th-greatest Klingon of the Star Trek franchise. In particular, they noted that she was an interesting character in the series, displaying both loyalty to the crew of the starship and brilliance as an engineer.

In 2017, Screen Rant ranked B'Elanna Torres as the 14th-most attractive person in the Star Trek universe.

In 2018, The Wrap ranked B'Elanna Torres as the 35th-best character of Star Trek overall. CBR ranked B'Elanna as the 14th-best Starfleet character of Star Trek, in 2018. They note that the former Maquis member works as chief engineer on the USS Voyager spacecraft, and must struggle with her ambivalent emotions about her Klingon heritage while keeping the warp engines working in the Delta quadrant (cutoff from Federation starbases). In addition, CBR opined that the character enhanced other characters aboard the starship, and praised the actress who portrayed her for making B’Elanna Torres's relationships more believable.

In 2019, B'Elanna Torres was ranked the 11th-sexiest Star Trek character by Syfy.

B’Elanna's struggle to reconcile both sides of her Klingon/Human hybrid heritage has been praised by audiences of multi-ethnic backgrounds.

In 2020 ScreenRant ranked B'Elanna and Tom Paris as the 3rd best romantic couple of all Star Trek''.

References

External links

 StarTrek.com Bio 

Klingons
Fictional women soldiers and warriors
Fictional characters with major depressive disorder
Fictional extraterrestrial–human hybrids
Television characters introduced in 1995
Fictional female engineers
Starfleet engineers
Starfleet lieutenants
Star Trek hybrids
Star Trek: Voyager characters
Fictional people from the 24th-century
Female characters in television